The 1931 Gateshead by-election was a parliamentary by-election held on 8 June 1931 for the British House of Commons constituency of Gateshead.

Previous MP 
The seat had become vacant on when the constituency's Labour Member of Parliament (MP), Sir James Melville, had died on 1 May, aged 46.  He had been Gateshead's MP since the 1929 general election, and had been Solicitor-General from 1929 to 1930.

Candidates 
The Conservative Party candidate was Cuthbert Headlam, who had been MP for Barnard Castle from 1924 until his defeat in 1929.  Labour selected Herbert Evans, who had stood unsuccessfully at the 1929 election in the Maldon constituency in Essex.

In 1929, there had been both a Liberal and an independent candidate in Gateshead, but the by-election was a two-way contest between Labour and Conservative.

Results 
The result was a narrow victory for Evans.  His 51.6% share of the votes was only a small fall from his predecessor's result in 1929, but Headlam picked up the votes which had previously gone to Liberal and independent candidates, and cut the Labour majority from a safe 31.1% to a precarious 3.2%.

However, Evans did not live to defend the seat; he died on 7 October, the day on which Parliament was dissolved for the 1931 general election.  The Gateshead seat was then won by the National Liberal Party candidate, Thomas Magnay, and Headlam was re-elected in Barnard Castle.

Votes

See also
 Gateshead constituency
 Gateshead
 List of United Kingdom by-elections (1918–1931)
 United Kingdom by-election records

References
 
 

1931 elections in the United Kingdom
1931 in England
20th century in County Durham
Politics of Gateshead
Elections in Tyne and Wear
By-elections to the Parliament of the United Kingdom in County Durham constituencies
June 1931 events